Quercus invaginata is a species of plant in the family Fagaceae. It is a variety of oak endemic to the Mexican state of Coahuila. It is placed in section Quercus.

References

invaginata
Endemic oaks of Mexico
Flora of the Sierra Madre Oriental
Trees of Coahuila
Data deficient plants
Taxonomy articles created by Polbot
Taxa named by William Trelease